Ribarroja Club de Fútbol is a Spanish football team based in Riba-roja de Túria, in the autonomous community of Valencia. Founded in 1942 it plays in Regional Preferente, holding home games at Estadio Municipal de Ribarroja, which has a capacity of 3,000 spectators.

Season to season

7 seasons in Tercera División

Famous players
 Miguel Albiol
 Raúl Albiol
 Diego Ribera

External links
Official website 
Futbolme team profile 

Football clubs in the Valencian Community
Association football clubs established in 1942
1942 establishments in Spain